Victor Lanoux (18 June 1936 – 4 May 2017) was a French actor best known to English speaking audiences for his role as Ludovic in Cousin, Cousine.

Biography
Victor Lanoux, born Victor Robert Nataf was the son of a Tunisian Jew from Sfax and a Catholic mother from Normandy. He was evacuated from Paris during the Second World War. Lanoux refers to the name used during his stay in La Chapelle-Taillefert during the French occupation where he lived until the age of 11, when he returned to Paris. 

He left school at age 14 to become an apprentice varnisher. He worked a variety of jobs, including the Simca automotive assembly line, until he served in the French Army during the Algerian War and was wounded, being awarded the Medal for War Wounded (Médaille des blessés de guerre).  

His father got him a job at the Studio de Billancourt. He learned acting by correspondence course, then a real course.

Career
In 1961 he met Pierre Richard who was looking for someone to partner his cabaret act. They worked together for a number of years, including a season at the Bobino and a tour of Le Gorille.

The act was seen by René Allio who cast Lanoux in La Vielle Dame Indigne (1965). This led to a starring role in La Vie Normale (1967).

Georges Wilson of the TNP cast Lanoux as Laertes in 'Hamlet'; he followed this with 'La Folle de Chaillot' at the TNP, then a three-year run as star of Illusion Comique.

He made one of his earliest film appearances in The Shameless Old Lady. He received two nominations at the 1st César Awards in 1976, for his roles in Cousin Cousine and Adieu poulet. His best known role outside of Europe is perhaps that of The Thief in the 1985 comedy classic National Lampoon's European Vacation.

Filmography

Theater

References

External links 

1936 births
2017 deaths
Male actors from Paris
French male film actors
French people of Tunisian-Jewish descent
20th-century French male actors
Deaths from cerebrovascular disease